The second season of the action-adventure television series The A-Team premiered in the United States on NBC on September 20, 1983, and concluded on May 15, 1984, consisting of 23 episodes.

Cast
 George Peppard as Lieutenant Colonel/Colonel John "Hannibal" Smith
 Dirk Benedict as First Lieutenant Templeton "Faceman" Peck
 Melinda Culea as journalist/reporter Amy Amanda "Triple A" Allen (11 Episodes Only)
 Dwight Schultz as Captain H. M. Murdock
 Mr. T as Sergeant First Class Bosco Albert "B. A." (Bad Attitude) Baracus
 Marla Heasley as journalist/reporter Tawnia Baker (7 episodes)

Opening credits
The second season's opening credits consisted of scenes taken from Season 1's "Til' Death Do Us Part", "West Coast Turnaround", "Black Day at Bad Rock", "A Small and Deadly War", and "One More Time". Season 2's "The Taxicab Wars", "Steel", "Water, Water Everywhere", and "The Only Church in Town".

Version 1
Version 1 was Melinda Culea's final season
Hannibal launches the cannon at a pursuing Jeep in Season 1's "Mexican Slayride" (as previous version).
The helicopter chase from the Season 1 episode "Til' Death Do Us Part".
Hannibal was dressed as the aquamaniac, tempting Colonel Lynch in Season 1's "Mexican Slayride".
Hannibal disguised as an old woman in Season 1's "One More Time".
Hannibal disguised as a hippy doctor in Season 1's "West Coast Turnaround".
Hannibal prepares to step out of the helicopter in Season 1's "Mexican Slayride" (as previous version).
Face in taxi going through a car wash in Season 1's "Til' Death Do Us Part".
Face in the back of the A-Team van in Season 1's "A Small and Deadly War" (actual shot not used in that episode).
Face posing as Dr. Dwight Pepper in Warden Beale's office in Season 1's "Pros and Cons".
Another shot of Face, taken from Season 1's "A Small and Deadly War".
Amy smiling in Season 2's "The Only Church in Town" (actual shot not used in that episode).
Amy laughing in the back of the A-Team van in the final act of Season 1's "One More Time" (actual shot not used in that episode).
Amy at the wedding reception in Season 1's "Til' Death Do Us Part".
Amy in the disused warehouse in Season 1's "The Beast from the Belly of a Boeing".
Murdock in the catering truck, coughing after eating shaving cream, in Season 1's "Til' Death Do Us Part".
Murdock singing in the make shift aircraft in Season 1's "Holiday in the Hills".
Murdock reveals himself as the bride in Season 1's "Til' Death Do Us Part".
Murdock emerges from the wrecked car, hat on sideways, and head crooked, in Season 1's "West Coast Turnaround".
B.A. bursts into the Mexican bar while making his entrance in Season 1's "Mexican Slayride" (as previous version).
B.A. breaks into a smile while holding up his fist, at the end of Season 1's "Black Day at Bad Rock".
B.A. turns his head around to see what Hannibal is doing in Season 1's "Mexican Slayride" (as previous version).
The car (driven by Hannibal, B.A., and Murdock) crashes into the front of the sheriff's office in Season 1's "Pros and Cons" (as previous version).
The helicopter (piloted by Murdock) forces the mobsters' car off the road in Season 1's "The Rabbit Who Ate Las Vegas" (as previous version).
A Jeep flips over as Hannibal throws a grenade in Season 1's "Mexican Slayride" (as previous version).

Version 2
Version 2 of the Season 2 opening credits removed shots of Melinda Culea, and replaced them with more scenes for the rest of the characters:
Hannibal launches the cannon at a pursuing Jeep in Season 1's "Mexican Slayride" (as previous version, note that Melinda Culea can still briefly seen behind Hannibal).
The helicopter chase from the Season 1 episode "Til' Death Do Us Part" (as previous version).
Hannibal was dressed as the aquamaniac, tempting Colonel Lynch in Season 1's "Mexican Slayride" (as previous version).
Hannibal disguised as an old woman in Season 1's "One More Time" (as previous version).
Hannibal disguised as a hippy doctor in Season 1's "West Coast Turnaround" (as previous version).
Hannibal prepares to step out of the helicopter in Season 1's "Mexican Slayride" (as previous version).
Face saying goodbye to sister Teresa at the end of Season 2's "The Only Church in Town".
A cylon walking past causes Face to double take in the Season 2 episode "Steel".
Face posing as Dr. Dwight Pepper in Warden Beale's office in Season 1's "Pros and Cons" (as previous version).
Another shot of Face, taken from Season 1's "A Small and Deadly War" (as previous version).
Murdock in the catering truck, coughing after eating shaving cream in Season 1's "Til' Death Do Us Part".
Murdock singing in the make shift aircraft in Season 1's "Holiday in the Hills" (as previous version).
Murdock disguised himself as "Captain Cab", as he talks to a sock puppet named "Socki", but breaks into safe in Season 2's "The Taxicab Wars".
Murdock reveals himself as the bride in Season 1's "Til' Death Do Us Part" (as previous version).
Murdock emerges from the wrecked car, hat on sideways, and head crooked, in Season 1's "West Coast Turnaround" (as previous version).
B.A. bursts into the Mexican bar while making his entrance, in Season 1's "Mexican Slayride" (as previous version).
After throwing an opponent over the bar, B.A. turns his head to give an angry glare, in Season 2's "Water, Water Everywhere".
B.A. breaks into a smile while holding up his fist, at the end of Season 1's "Black Day at Bad Rock" (as previous version).
B.A. turns his head to see what Hannibal is doing in Season 1's "Mexican Slayride" (as previous version).
The car (driven by Hannibal, B.A., and Murdock) crashes into the front of the sheriff's office in Season 1's "Pros and Cons" (as previous version).
The helicopter (piloted by Murdock) forces the mobsters' car off the road in Season 1's "The Rabbit Who Ate Las Vegas" (as previous version).
A Jeep flips over as Hannibal throws a grenade in Season 1's "Mexican Slayride" (as previous version).

Episodes

1984 American television seasons
The A-Team seasons
1983 American television seasons